Marcelová (Hungarian pronunciation:) is a village and municipality in the Komárno District in the Nitra Region of south-west Slovakia.

Geography
The village lies at an altitude of 112 metres and covers an area of 35.75 km².

History
In the 9th century, the territory of Marcelová became part of the Kingdom of Hungary. In historical records, the village was first mentioned in 1245.
After the Austro-Hungarian army disintegrated in November 1918, Czechoslovak troops occupied the area, later acknowledged internationally by the Treaty of Trianon. Between 1938 and 1945, Marcelová once more  became part of Miklós Horthy's Hungary through the First Vienna Award. From 1945 until the Velvet Divorce, it was part of Czechoslovakia. Since then, it has been part of Slovakia.

Demographics
Marcelová has a population of about 3,825 people. The village is about 88% Hungarian, 10% Slovak and 2% Romany.

Facilities
The village has a public library, and a football pitch.

Notable people
 

Gejza Baranyai (born 1983), football player

References

Villages and municipalities in the Komárno District
Hungarian communities in Slovakia